is a former Japanese football player.

Playing career
Koki Nakamura played for J3 League club; Fujieda MYFC in 2015 season.

References

External links

1992 births
Living people
Biwako Seikei Sport College alumni
Association football people from Osaka Prefecture
People from Moriguchi, Osaka
Japanese footballers
J3 League players
Fujieda MYFC players
Association football defenders